Oberea bisbipunctata is a species of flat-faced longhorn beetle in the tribe Saperdini in the genus Oberea, discovered by Maurice Pic in 1916.

Subspecies
 Oberea bisbipunctata discoreducta Breuning, 1969
 Oberea bisbipunctata bisbipunctata Pic, 1916

References

B
Beetles described in 1916